The London Borough of Lambeth, in spite of being close to the centre of London has over 64 areas of parks and open spaces, in addition to 34 play areas and eight paddling pools, within its boundaries. In common with all the London boroughs these green spaces provide "lungs" for the leisure pursuits of the inhabitants.

Principal parks and open spaces
The largest of them include:
 Agnes Riley Gardens, Atkins Road, SW12
 Archbishops Park, Carlisle Lane, SE1, adjacent to Lambeth Palace  
 Brockwell Park, Norwood Road, SE24, includes Brockwell Lido (public swimming area)
 Clapham Common, Windmill Drive, SW4, wholly maintained by Lambeth Borough, although the western half is situated in Wandsworth Borough
 Hillside Gardens, Hillside Road, SW2 
Jubilee Gardens, Lambeth, SE1
 Kennington Park, Kennington Park Road, SE11, a wooded area, although it has sports facilities and gardens 
 Larkhall Park, Courland Grove, SW8 
 Max Roach Park, Brixton Road, SW9 (named after Max Roach in 1986)
 Milkwood Community Park, Milkwood Road, SE24 
 Mostyn, Olive Morris and Dan Leno Gardens, Myatt's Fields North housing estate, Akerman Road, SW9 
 Myatt's Fields Park, Cormont Road, Camberwell, SE5 
 Norwood Park, Salters Hill, SE19 - between West Norwood and Crystal Palace
 Rush Common, Brixton Hill, SW2 
 Ruskin Park, Denmark Hill, SE5 
 Slade Gardens, Lorn Road, SW9
 Spring Gardens, Tyers Street, SE11 
 Streatham Common, Streatham High Road, SW16 
 Streatham Vale Park, Abercairn Road, SW16 
 The Rookery, Covington Way, SW16, with formal gardens and an open-air theatre
Vauxhall Park, Lawn Lane, SW8, near The Oval cricket ground
 Vauxhall City Farm, SE11

Riverside
Lambeth is a riverside borough, and one of the largest open spaces is the Thames itself, forming the northern boundary of the borough. A sign posted riverside trail forms a walkway for both pedestrians and cyclists.

External links
 General information on Lambeth parks and green spaces

 
History of the London Borough of Lambeth